Apolonia Fier are an Albanian football club based in Fier. The 2020–21 season will be the clubs 95th competitive season since the club was founded. During this season the club will have competed in the following competitions: Kategoria Superiore, Albanian Cup.

Current squad

Competitions

Kategoria Superiore

League table

Results summary

Matches

Albanian Cup

Statistics

Appearances and goals

Goalscorers

References

1. *soccerway
2. *betexplorer
3. *worldfootball

External links
Facebook Official Page
Website Official
Stadiumi Loni Papuciu Facebook
YouTube Official
Lajme nga Futbolli Shqiptar
K.F. Apolonia Fier
Apolonia Fier at EUFO.DE
Apolonia Fier at Weltfussball.de
Apolonia Fier at UEFA.COM
Apolonia Fier at Playerhistory.com

 

2020-21
Apolonia